China National Highway 351 is a partially completed highway in China. The highway starts at the Port of Taizhou and runs halfway across the country to Dawei, Xiaojin County. The highway passes through the provinces of Zhejiang, Jiangxi, Hubei, Chongqing, and Sichuan. In 2017, the provincial government of Zhejiang approved the construction of the Zhejiang section of the highway.

References

351
Transport in China
Transport in Zhejiang
Transport in Jiangxi
Transport in Hubei
Transport in Chongqing
Transport in Sichuan